Ahmad Eskandarpour (born 25 July 1955) is an Iranian fencer. He competed in the individual and team sabre events at the 1976 Summer Olympics.

References

External links
 

1955 births
Living people
Iranian male sabre fencers
Olympic fencers of Iran
Fencers at the 1976 Summer Olympics
Asian Games gold medalists for Iran
Asian Games medalists in fencing
Fencers at the 1974 Asian Games
Medalists at the 1974 Asian Games
20th-century Iranian people